Break with the Boss is a British television programme that aired in the UK on Living TV from 1 November to 20 December 2006. An eight part series which sees different bosses each week take three of their employees away on holiday, during which they will have to complete challenges. The show was hosted by Liz Bonnin.

Bosses during the series

External links
 Break With The Boss Production Website

2006 British television series debuts
2006 British television series endings
Sky Living original programming
English-language television shows
2000s British game shows
Television series by ITV Studios